The World Folk Music Association is a non-profit organization formed in 1983 by folk singer/songwriter Tom Paxton and Dick Cerri, a radio host from Washington D. C. The first chairman of the board was Paxton and Cerri served as president.

Paxton and Cerri declared that the WFMA was "dedicated to promoting contemporary and traditional folk music, spreading the word to fans, and keeping the folk community informed and involved". 

WFMA presents a monthly showcase in Bethesda, Maryland, and from 1984 to 2011 hosted an annual benefit concert. The WFMA presented its Lifetime Achievement Award, Kate Wolf Award, and John Denver award at its annual concert through 2006. The Washington Post described the 6th annual concert as "nostalgic and topical, competent and compelling".

To celebrate Woody Guthrie's 82d birthday, WFMA presented a Woody Guthrie Tribute Concert in 1994. A two-night concert in tribute of The Kingston Trio's 45th anniversary was held by WFMA in 2002. In 2013, WFMA hosted a benefit concert to support the Madison House Autism Foundation. WFMA also sponsored the final Chad Mitchell Trio concert in 2014.

WFMA Lifetime Achievement Award
The first recipient of the WFMA Lifetime Achievement Award was Odetta in 1994. Other winners include:

Lou Gottlieb of the Limeliters, 1995
Oscar Brand, 1996
Bob Gibson, 1997 (posthumous award)
John Denver, 1998 (posthumous award)
Tommy Makem, 1999
Rod Kennedy, 2000
John Stewart, 2001
Joe Glazer, 2002
Carolyn Hester, 2003
Dave Van Ronk, 2004 (posthumous award)
Dick Cerri, 2005
Tom Paxton, 2006

Kate Wolf Memorial Award
Established in 1987 to honor the memory of Kate Wolf, a singer/songwriter who died from leukemia, the Kate Wolf Memorial Award is presented "to the performer who best epitomizes the music and spirit of Kate Wolf." It has been awarded to:
Utah Phillips, 1988
Christine Lavin of Four Bitchin' Babes, 1989
Rosalie Sorrels, 1990
Robin Batteau, 1991
Hugh Romney, also known as Wavy Gravy, 1992
Peter Yarrow of Peter, Paul, and Mary, 1993
Crow Johnson, 1994
Nanci Griffith, 1995
Jack Hardy, 1996
Tom Chapin, 1997
David Buskin, 1998
Nina Gerber, 1999
Noel Paul Stookey of Peter, Paul, and Mary, 2000
The Kennedys, 2001
Anne Hills, 2002
David Massengill, 2003
Tom Rowe of Schooner Fare, 2004 (posthumous award)
The Shaw Brothers, 2005

John Denver Award

Established in 1998, the John Denver Award was awarded in 1999 to Denver's original publisher and producer, Milt Okun. Other recipients include:
Kenn Roberts, 2000
Bill Danoff, 2001
Tom Wisner, 2003
Greg Artzner and Terry Leonino (Magpie), 2004
Dawn Publications, 2006

References

External links
Official website

American folk music